The 2013 NCAA Division I softball tournament was held from May 16 through June 4, 2013 as the final part of the 2013 NCAA Division I softball season. The 64 NCAA Division I college softball teams were selected out of an eligible 284 teams on May 12, 2012. 31 teams were awarded an automatic bid as champions of their conference, and 33 teams were selected at-large by the NCAA Division I Softball Selection Committee. The tournament culminated with eight teams playing in the 2013 Women's College World Series at ASA Hall of Fame Stadium in Oklahoma City.

Automatic bids

National seeds
Teams in "italics" advanced to super regionals.
Teams in "bold" advanced to Women's College World Series.

Oklahoma
Florida

 
 Alabama

Regionals and super regionals

Norman Super Regional

Ann Arbor Super Regional

Tempe Super Regional

Austin Super Regional

Eugene Super Regional

Columbia Super Regional

Knoxville Super Regional

Gainesville Super Regional

Women's College World Series
The Women's College World Series was held 30 May through June 4 in Oklahoma City.

Participants

Bracket

Championship game

Media Coverage

Radio
Dial Global Sports provided nationwide radio coverage of the championship series, which was also streamed online at dialglobalsports.com. Kevin Kugler and Leah Amico provided the call for Dial Global.

Television
ESPN carried every game from the Women's College World Series across the ESPN Networks (ESPN, ESPN2, and ESPNU).  The ESPN Networks also carried select regional matches and every super regional match utilizing ESPN, ESPN2, ESPNU, and ESPN3. Austin hosted a regional, and the Texas games aired on Longhorn Network while the other matches will air on ESPN3. This was the second consecutive year Longhorn Network carried regional matches.

Broadcast Assignments

Regionals
Pam Ward & Michele Mary Smith – College Station, TX
Beth Mowins & Jessica Mendoza – Tempe, AZ
Sam Gore & Garland Cooper – Ann Arbor, MI
Melissa Lee & Charlotte Morgan – Mobile, AL
Cara Capuano & Leah Amico – Lexington, KY
Mark Neely & Amanda Freed – Columbia, SC
Carter Blackburn & Amanda Scarborough – Austin, TX
Jeanne Zelasko & Tracy Warren – Norman, OK
Women's College World Series
Pam Ward or Beth Mowins, Jessica Mendoza or Michele Mary Smith & Holly Rowe

Super regionals
Pam Ward & Michele Mary Smith – Norman, OK
Mark Neely & Amanda Freed – Columbia, SC
Joe Davis & Garland Cooper – Ann Arbor, MI
Beth Mowins & Jessica Mendoza – Knoxville, TN
Holly Rowe & Amanda Scarborough – Austin, TX
Jeanne Zelasko & Cheri Kempf – Gainesville, FL
Adam Amin & Jennie Finch – Eugene, OR
Cara Capuano & Leah Amico – Tempe, AZ
Women's College World Series championship series
Beth Mowins, Jessica Mendoza, Michele Mary Smith & Holly Rowe

References

Tournament
NCAA Division I softball tournament